Karabegović is a Bosniak surname. Notable people with the surname include:

Avdo Karabegović Hasanbegov (1878–1900), Bosnian poet
S. Avdo Karabegović (1878–1908), Bosnian poet
Osman Karabegović (1911–1996), Yugoslav and Bosnian politician

Bosnian surnames